Robot Archie is the name of a fictional comic book character from Lion, a weekly British boys' adventure title.

Publishing history
Robot Archie appeared in Lion Issue #1 in February 1952; it was published by Amalgamated Press — at the time, the biggest publisher of weekly adventure comics in the UK, along with DC Thomson. Lion was a science fiction action-adventure title in the mould of Eagle, and was a direct competitor to it.

Archie began his career in Lion with the moniker The Jungle Robot. The character was created by writer E. George Cowan and artist Ted Kearon (also known as Jim Kearon). The strip lasted 25 weeks before it took a five-year hiatus and returned in 1957 as Archie, The Robot Explorer, eventually becoming better known as Robot Archie.

The strip was one of Lion'''s most popular during the '60s, but the character's adventures ended when Lion was finally cancelled in May '74. The series was published in France and the Netherlands, and was popular there. In the Netherlands, beginning in 1971, Robot Archie appeared in the comics magazine Sjors, for which Bert Bus drew new Archie material (which was translated into French, as well), and two or three series of albums, which — like the Archie publication in France — were halted in the early '80s. Robot Archie strips appeared in colour (with re-drawn art from the Dutch series) in Vulcan, a short-lived weekly title which lasted until 1976. 

After that, Robot Archie entered publishing limbo but remained well-loved by fans. He made a brief cameo showing under the name "Android Andy" in Alan Moore and Alan Davis's run on Captain Britain for Marvel UK. Subsequently, Archie emerged in the pages of Grant Morrison's Zenith strip in 2000 AD. There, he was portrayed as a burned-out acid casualty calling himself "Acid Archie". 

In 2004, a new "Classic Archie" adventure by Bert Bus was published in Dutch.

In 2005–2006, Robot Archie, as well as many of IPC's adventure heroes, appeared in the six-issue limited series Albion, published by the Wildstorm imprint of DC Comics. Albion  was plotted by Alan Moore, and written by Leah Moore and John Reppion, with art by Shane Oakley and George Freeman. Robot Archie was featured on the cover of the first issue, which was drawn by Dave Gibbons.

Fictional character biography
Robot Archie was built by Professor C.R. Ritchie to be the world's most powerful mechanical man. Originally, he was dubbed "The Jungle Robot" (due to his early adventures taking place in the jungles of Africa and South America), and was controlled remotely by Professor Ritchie, along with nephew Ted Ritchie and Ken Dale, his best friend. 

Robot Archie's adventures started off as conventional action-thrillers, with Archie and his friends battling criminals and jungle creatures, but over time, he began to fight more fantastic and dangerous villains and aliens, including The Sludge, a monster that had previously had its own strip in Lion.

Initially, Archie could not speak, but around 1966, he gained a voice box, revealing a boastful, yet charming, personality.

When Robot Archie re-appeared in the pages of Grant Morrison's Zenith as "Acid Archie", part of a team of heroes called Black Flag; there, he helped Zenith fight the evil, supernatural race known as the Lloigor. Archie was apparently destroyed by Ruby Fox, a.k.a. "Voltage", in Phase IV, when she short-circuited him whilst he was trying to rip off her head. But later, that was revealed to have been a copy of Archie within the Chimera pocket universe, as he is seen partying with Zenith and Peter St. John, a.k.a. "Mandala" during the epilogue. 

Archie also surfaced in zzzenith.com, in the special Prog 2001 edition of 2000AD, where Zenith explained that rust in the brain-pan had caused Archie's personality to switch from anarchist Acid-House aficionado to vigilante, hunting down sex offenders with a lethal vigour. He was last seen in the story wearing a false beard, as he escaped on a bus after sexually assaulting pop star Britney Spears.

Robot Archie's swan song was in Albion'', where he was found in the basement of a Manchester pub by Penny Dolmann (the daughter of Eric Dolmann), who repaired and modified him in order to rescue her father. He was being held in an isolated Scottish asylum/prison where IPC's heroes had been sent simply for the "crime" of being different. Archie killed many guards and was destroyed whilst acting as a decoy for Penny.

References

External links
Robot Archie at International Superhero
History of Lion at comicsuk

British comic strips
Drama comics
Science fiction comics
1952 comics debuts
Comics characters introduced in 1952
2006 comics endings
British comics characters
WildStorm superheroes
Fleetway and IPC Comics
Fictional humanoid robots
Male characters in comics